Ivan Bahrianyi (2 October 1906 – 25 August 1963) was a Ukrainian writer, essayist, novelist and politician, Shevchenko prize awardee (1992, postmortem).  The writer's real name was Ivan Pavlovych Lozoviaha (Lozoviahin).

Biography

Early years 
Ivan Bahrianyi was born in the village of Kuzemyn, Kharkiv Governorate, Russian Empire, in the family of a bricklayer. His education was not consistent, due to the difficulty of life during First World War, the revolution and the post-war chaos in education. He started at age of 6 in church-parochial school. Later Bahrianyi finished higher elementary school in Okhtyrka. Having completed his secondary education, in 1920 he entered the locksmith school, then he got admitted to an artistic school. 

In 1922, a period of work and active social and political life began: he was deputy chief of a sugar mill, then a district political inspector at the Okhtyr police, and a drawing teacher in a colony for homeless and orphans. At that time he visited Donbas, Crimea, and Kuban.  Bahrianyi did enter the Kyiv Art Institute, but did not graduate f due to material distress and prejudiced attitude of the management. Due to that he was speaking Ukrainian and was Ukrainian-spirited young man, his peers mocked him for a long time and called him mazepian (a Russian derogatory term for Ukrainians after Ivan Mazepa, similar to modern Banderites), that may have been one of the reasons for joining the OUN in the future.

During the Civil War and in the early 1920s he was involved in the Soviet social and political work, but in 1925 he left Komsomol. In 1926, he began to publish poetry in newspapers and journals and in 1927, his first collection of poetry appeared. In 1929 he published a collection of poems "Ave Maria", which was almost immediately forbidden by censorship and removed from the book trade. Bahrianyi was a member of the Kyiv association of young writers, MARS (an abbreviation for Shop of revolutionary word) where he met such writers as: Valerian Pidmohylny, Yevhen Pluzhnyk, Borys Antonenko-Davydovych, Hryhory Kosynka, Teodosiy Osmachko,  and others who were criticized and repressed by official Soviet authorities. In 1930, a historical novel "Skelka" was published in verse. It tells of the uprising in the village of Skelka in the eighteenth century against the arbitrariness of the Moscow monks of the monastery, near the village. The peasants burned down the monastery, protesting against national oppression.

Arrest and detention 
On April 16, 1932, Ivan Bahrianyi was arrested in Kharkiv on a charge of "counter-revolutionary propaganda" he allegedly spread in his poems. He spent 11 months in a separate cell (solitary confinement) in OGPU inner prison. On October 25, 1932 he was sentenced to 3 years of colony at the Far East. He tried to escape, but unsuccessfully, sentence was extended for 3 years, Ivan Bahrianyi was transferred to another camp - BAM.
The exact date when he returned home is unknown, but on June 16, 1938 he has been re-arrested and placed in Kharkiv NKVD jail. Bahrianyi was charged on participating in and even leading the nationalist counter-revolutionary organization. Later he used his autobiographical details in his novel Sad Hetsymans'kyi

War years 
The World War II caught the writer in Okhtyrka. He was involved in the Ukrainian national underground movement, moved to Galicia. He worked in the OUN propaganda sector, wrote songs on patriotic themes, various articles, draw cartoons and propaganda posters. He also participated in the establishment of the Ukrainian Supreme Liberation Council (USLC), developed its policy documents. At the same time, he continued his literary activities. In 1944 Bahrianyi wrote his novel Zvіrolovi (eng. Tiger Trappers published in English as "The Hunters and the Hunted"), the poem Huliaipole.
In 1945, prior to the defeat of Hitler's troops, Ivan Bahrianyi emigrated to Germany through OUN.

Emigration 
After the end of the war, on behalf of ex-OST-Arbeiter and war prisoner, Bahrianyi wrote a pamphlet named Why I am not going back to the Soviet Union?. The pamphlet was presenting the Soviet Union as a "stepmother" that arranged genocide against its own people. In 1948 he founded the Ukrainian Revolutionary Democratic Party (URDP). Starting from 1948 till his death in 1963 he had been editing the newspaper Ukrains'ki visti (eng. Ukrainian news). He headed the executive committee of the Ukrainian National Council, also performed the duties of the Deputy President of the UNR in exile.
In 1963 the Democratic Union of Ukrainian Youth based in Chicago started action to support awarding Ivan Bahrianyi with the Nobel Prize, but his sudden death failed him to be formally forwarded for the award. Ivan Bahrianyi died on August 25, 1963. He was buried in Neu Ulm (Germany).

Works

Stories
 story Etude (1921)

Novellas / Tales
 novella Defeat (1948)
 The Fiery Circle (Neu Ulm, 1953)

Novels
 novel in verse "Skelka" (Kharkiv, 1929)
 novel Zvirolovy (eng. Trappers)  (Lviv-Kraków, 1944) / novel Tyhrolovy (eng. Tiger trappers, published in English as "The Hunters and the Hunted") (Neu Ulm, 1946)
 novel Sad Hetsymanskyi (eng. Garden of Gethsemane) (Neu Ulm, 1950)
 Marusia Bohuslavka - the first book of the novel Wild Wind (Munich, 1957)
 A man runs over an abyss (published posthumously, Neu Ulm - New York, 1965)

Poems
 poem Mongolia (1927)
 poem Ave, Maria (Kharkiv, 1928)
 poem Huliaipole 
 poem for children The phone (1956)
 collection of poems In the sweat of the forehead (1929, was prohibited for publication by censorship)
 collection of poems The Golden Boomerang (1946)

Playwrights
 Lilac
 The General (1947)
 Morituri (1947)

Articles
 pamphlet Why I am not going back to the Soviet Union?

Unknown
 Mother tongue
 Shots in the taiga

Family 
Ivan Bahrianyi was married twice; his first wife was Antonina Zosimova, they had two children: son Boris and daughter Natasha. In exile he married again to Halyna Tryhub (born in Ternopil). They also had two children: son Nestor and daughter Roksolana.

Awards 
In 1992, Ivan Bahrianyi posthumously received the national Shevchenko Prize for his novels Tyhrolovy and Sad Hetsymanskyi.

References

External links
 A short biography by Yevhen Shtendera
 Ivan Bahrianyi (in Ukrainian) 
 Ivan Bahrianyi at The Library of Congress
 Ivan Bahrianyi at Virtual International Authority File
 Ivan Bahrianyi. Sad Hetsymansʹkyĭ
 Ivan Bahrianyi. The Hunters and the Hunted (1954)

1906 births
1963 deaths
People from Sumy Oblast
People from Kharkov Governorate
Ukrainian politicians before 1991
Ukrainian writers
Ukrainian exiles
Soviet prisoners and detainees
20th-century pseudonymous writers
Recipients of the Shevchenko National Prize
Organization of Ukrainian Nationalists politicians
Soviet emigrants to Germany
Soviet writers